The Aarne Honkavaara trophy is an ice hockey trophy given by the Finnish Liiga to the player who scores the most goals during regular season play.

Trophy Winners:

1977-78: Markku Kiimalainen (Kärpät)
 
1978-79: Kari Makkonen (Ässät)

1979-80: Matti Hagman (HIFK)

1980-81: Arto Javanainen (Ässät)

1981-82: Reijo Leppänen (TPS)

1982-83: Raimo Summanen (Ilves)

1983-84: Arto Javanainen (Ässät)

1984-85: Mikko Mäkelä (Ilves)

1985-86: Arto Javanainen (Ässät)

1986-87: Risto Kurkinen (JYP)

1987-88: Arto Javanainen (TPS)

1988-89: Jukka Vilander (TPS)

1989-90: Raimo Summanen (Ilves)

1990-91: Arto Javanainen (Ässät)

1991-92: Teemu Selänne (Jokerit)

1992-93: Tomas Kapusta (HPK)

1993-94: Marko Jantunen (TPS)

1994-95: Kai Nurminen (HPK)

1995-96: Juha Riihijärvi (Lukko)

1996-97: Petri Varis (Jokerit)

1997-98: Dale McTavish (SaiPa)

1998-99: Pasi Saarela (Jokerit)

1999-00: Kai Nurminen (TPS)

2000-01: Jaroslav Bednar (HIFK)

2001-02: Vesa Viitakoski (Ilves)

2002-03: Tomas Kucharcik (HPK)

2003-04: Timo Pärssinen (HIFK)

2004-05: Pasi Saarela (Lukko)

2005-06: Tony Salmelainen (HIFK)

2006-07: Jani Rita (Jokerit)

2007-08: Janne Pesonen (Kärpät)

2008-09: Jussi Makkonen (HPK)

2009-10: Jukka Hentunen (Jokerit)

2010-11: Janne Lahti (Jokerit)

2011-12: Tomáš Záborský (Ässät)

2012-13: Juha-Pekka Haataja (Kärpät)

2013-14: Olli Palola (Tappara)

2014-15: Olli Palola (Tappara)

2015-16: Chad Rau (SaiPa)

2016-17: Veli-Matti Savinainen (Tappara)

2017-18: Charles Bertrand (Kärpät)

2018-19: Malte Strömwall (KooKoo)

2019-20: Julius Nättinen (JYP)

2020-21: Sebastian Wännström (Ässät)

2021-22: Anton Levtchi (Tappara)

2022-23: Reid Gardiner (JYP)

References

Aarne Honkavaara trophy